Opsariichthys bidens, the Chinese hooksnout carp, is a species of freshwater fish in the family Cyprinidae. It is endemic to fast-flowing streams and rivers of East Asia (China, Japan, North Korea, South Korea, and Russia) and mainland Southeast Asia (Laos and Vietnam).

References

Opsariichthys
Cyprinid fish of Asia
Freshwater fish of China
Freshwater fish of Japan
Fish of Korea
Fish of Laos
Fish of Russia
Fish of Vietnam
Taxa named by Albert Günther
Fish described in 1873